MX, Mx, mX, or mx may refer to:

Arts, entertainment, and media
 MX (band), a Brazilian thrash metal band
 Monsta X, occasionally shortened to "MX"
 mX (newspaper)
 "MX", a song by Deftones on the album Around the Fur
 MX (album), a 1993 album by David Murray
 Mylo Xyloto, a 2011 album by Coldplay
 MX Player, an Indian video on demand and streaming platform 
 MX (series), a trilogy of motocross racing video games
 Tokyo MX, a Japanese commercial broadcaster

Businesses and organizations
 Mexicana de Aviación (1921-2010), IATA code MX
 Breeze Airways (2021-present), IATA code MX
 Montreal Exchange
 Moon Express, an American spaceflight company

Science and technology

Computing and the internet
 .mx, the Internet top-level domain of Mexico
 Macromedia Studio MX, a web content software program
 Maximum mode, a processor hardware mode 
 MX Linux, a Debian-based operating system with sysvinit as default init, instead of systemd
 MX record, an Internet data element used for routing email
 OpenMx, a structural equation modeling software application
 WinMX, a file sharing program
 Juniper MX-Series a family of ethernet routers and switches designed by Juniper Networks

Weapons
 MX missiles, a series of experimental equipment
 MX missile, usually referring to the LGM-118 Peacekeeper

Other uses in science and technology
 Maxwell (unit), measuring magnetic flux
 Murexide, an ammonium compound
 Mutagen X, an organochloride
 MX, a designation for letter beacons, a type of radio transmission
 Cherry MX switches for mechanical keyboards
 Meizu MX series, a series of phones designed by Meizu

Other uses
 MX, Roman numeral for the number 1010
 Mexico (ISO 3166 country code MX)
 Motocross, a sport
 Malcolm X (1925-1965), African-American civil rights activist and Nation of Islam spokesperson
 Mx (title), a gender-neutral honorific

See also
 Model X (disambiguation)
 M10 (disambiguation)